The Green Line is a rapid transit line in the MARTA rail system. It operates between Bankhead and Edgewood / Candler Park stations, running exclusively inside the Atlanta city limits.

The Green Line is a stub of the originally planned North Line, which would have served points north beyond Bankhead such as Northside Drive in Brookwood Hills, serving the Perry Homes projects along the way. But the line was only ever built as far as Bankhead.

The Green Line was previously called the Proctor Creek Line until MARTA switched to a color-based naming system in October 2009.  The East-West Line, from its launch, was considered one line, denoted with a blue color on old system maps until 2006 when the West branch and the Proctor Creek branch were re-designated as the East-West Line (the current Blue Line) and the Proctor Creek Line (the current Green Line).  Using the Five Points station as a point of reference, the Proctor Creek portion of the East Line was designated for trips headed to Edgewood/Candler Park, and the West Line was designated for trips headed to Bankhead.

The rail line was part of the initial launch of MARTA rail service in 1979.  The first segment ran from the East Line segment from Georgia State to the Avondale stations upon the opening in June of that year.  By the end of 1979, it extended west to the Hightower station (now Hamilton E. Holmes) on the West Line segment, which serves as that station's terminus.  Although the North-South line was expanded throughout the 1980s, the East-West line did not see any extension since its opening until 1992 when the Proctor Creek branch of the line opened to its terminus at Bankhead station.  It finally extended to its current eastern terminus at Indian Creek the year after.

Now known as the Green Line, it shares trackage with its counterpart, the Blue Line, between just west of Ashby and Edgewood / Candler Park. Green Line rush-hour trains start at Avondale and pass Decatur and East Lake without stopping before pulling onto a pocket track just east of Edgewood/Candler Park.

The Green Line service operates between Bankhead and Edgewood / Candler Park stations all day until 9:00 p.m. on weekdays only. On Saturday, Sunday & holidays, the Green Line operates between Bankhead and King Memorial stations all day until 9:00 p.m.

After 9:00 p.m., the Green Line service operates between Bankhead and Vine City stations only until the end of the service.

Line description
The Green Line runs above ground, at-grade and below ground in various portions of its route. It begins at the western terminus of Bankhead station, paralleling Proctor Creek through West Atlanta. (This is the only portion of the Green Line not to share trackage with any other route, albeit a short distance.)  It is joined by the Blue Line before Ashby station.  The Green Line enters downtown Atlanta, where it meets the Red and Gold Lines at Five Points station.  It continues into East Atlanta, where the Green Line reaches its eastern terminus at Edgewood/Candler Park station, while the Blue Line continues on to Indian Creek station.

Stations
listed from west to east

Note:  The North-South (now Red/Gold Line) platform opened in 1981.

References

External links

 Green Line overview
 Green Line schedule

 
Railway lines opened in 1992